Gramella flava is a Gram-negative, aerobic and motile bacterium from the genus of Gramella which has been isolated from seawater.

References

Flavobacteria
Bacteria described in 2014